Jesse Lester McReynolds (born July 9, 1929) is an American bluegrass musician. He is best known for his innovative crosspicking and split-string styles of mandolin playing.

Biography
McReynolds was born in Coeburn, Virginia. He and his brother Jim begin performing together in or around 1947. They originally performed under the name, "The McReynolds Brothers." In 1951, Jesse and Jim, joined by Larry Roll on guitar, made their first recording, ten gospel songs for Kentucky Records under the name "The Virginia Trio". In 1952, Jim and Jesse signed with Capitol Records, who asked them to change their name from the "McReynolds Brothers," so they started recording under the name "Jim and Jesse and the Virginia Boys.". They recorded 20 songs for Capitol over three sessions in 1952, 1953, and 1955. During this time (1952-1954), Jesse also served in the US Army in Korea (they recorded sessions in 1953 while he was on leave). While serving in Korea, he and Charlie Louvin of the Louvin Brothers (who was also serving in Korea) formed a band called the "Dusty Roads Boys" and played regular concerts for other troops. After Jesse's return from Korea, Jim and Jesse continued to perform and release albums until Jim's death from cancer in 2002. McReynolds is married to his wife, Joy.

Since 2002, Jesse has continued to perform and record as a solo artist. McReynolds plays between 60 and 70 shows each year. Jim and Jesse became members of the Grand Ole Opry in 1964; Jesse continues to maintain the duo's Opry membership since Jim's death in 2001. He became the oldest standing Opry member in March 2020, following the death of fellow Opry member Jan Howard. In 2019, he celebrated his 55th anniversary as a member of the Opry. In January 2017 he appeared on the CMT network show Nashville as a blind singer who inspires the character Rayna Jaymes (played by Connie Britton).

Honors
 Member of the Grand Ole Opry since 1964 
 Inducted into International Bluegrass Music Hall of Honor in 1993
 Awarded National Heritage Fellowship Award in 1997
 Bending the Rules nominated for "Best Instrumental Recording of the Year" from the International Bluegrass Music Association in 2005.

RecordingsRecordings after 1979 from Old Dominion Masters liner notes

References

External links

Interview with Jesse McReynolds for the NAMM (National Association of Music Merchants) Oral History Program July 23, 2011

1929 births
Living people
American bluegrass mandolinists
American country singer-songwriters
Grand Ole Opry members
People from Coeburn, Virginia
Singer-songwriters from Virginia